Dag Ramsøy Bryn (17 March 1909 – 11 April 1991) was a Norwegian diplomat and politician for the Labour Party.

Biography
Bryn was born in Kristiania (now Oslo), Norway. He was the son of  Zakarias Bryn (1880-1943) and Ragna Emilie Canelius (1883-1949). He attended  the University of Oslo and University of Bergen studying psychology and earning his cand.mag. in 1932.

During World War II, he left Norway aboard the M/B Haugen  arriving at Lerwick in 1941. He subsequently served with the Free Norwegian forces in Scotland. After the liberation of Norway during 1945, he played a role in the design of Norwegian foreign and security policy. He served as state secretary in the Ministry of Defence from 1947 to 1950, in  Gerhardsen's Second Cabinet, and in the Ministry of Foreign Affairs from 1954 to 1958, in the cabinets of Oscar Torp and Gerhardsen's Third Cabinet. After this, he served as Norwegian ambassador to various foreign capitals including 
Bonn (1954 to 1957) and Belgrade   (1958-1963).

Bryn died at Tvedestrand during 1991  and was buried in Vestre Gravlund.

References

1909 births
1991 deaths
Politicians from Oslo
Norwegian military personnel of World War II
Norwegian state secretaries
Labour Party (Norway) politicians
Ambassadors of Norway to West Germany
Ambassadors of Norway to Morocco
Ambassadors of Norway to Yugoslavia
Grand Crosses 1st class of the Order of Merit of the Federal Republic of Germany
Recipients of the St. Olav's Medal
Burials at Vestre gravlund
Diplomats from Oslo